Napoleon A. Jones Jr. (August 25, 1940 – December 12, 2009) was a United States district judge of the United States District Court for the Southern District of California.

Early life and education
Jones was born in Hodge, Louisiana and graduated from San Diego High School in 1958. He received a Bachelor of Arts degree from San Diego State University in 1962, a Master of Social Work from San Diego State University in 1967, and a Juris Doctor from the University of San Diego School of Law in 1971. He was in the United States Army from 1962 to 1965.

Legal career
Jones was with California Rural Legal Assistance, in Modesto, California from 1971 to 1973. He was a legal intern from 1971 to 1972. He was a Staff Attorney from 1972 to 1973. He was a Staff Attorney with Defenders, Inc., San Diego, California from 1973 to 1975. He was in private practice in San Diego from 1975 to 1977.

Judicial career

California state court judicial service
Jones was a judge on the San Diego Municipal Court, California from 1977 to 1982. He was a judge on the San Diego Superior Court, California from 1982 to 1994.

Federal judicial service
Jones was a United States District Judge of the United States District Court for the Southern District of California. Jones was nominated by President Bill Clinton on June 8, 1994, to a seat vacated by Earl Ben Gilliam. He was confirmed by the United States Senate on September 14, 1994, and received his commission on September 15, 1994. He assumed senior status on September 19, 2007, serving until his death on December 12, 2009.

See also 
 List of African-American federal judges
 List of African-American jurists

References

External links

1940 births
2009 deaths
20th-century American judges
20th-century American lawyers
21st-century American judges
African-American judges
California lawyers
Judges of the United States District Court for the Southern District of California
People from Jackson Parish, Louisiana
San Diego State University alumni
Superior court judges in the United States
United States Army personnel
United States district court judges appointed by Bill Clinton
University of San Diego School of Law alumni
San Diego High School alumni